Cédric Grolet (born 28 August 1985, Firminy, France) is a French  pastry chef. He is the executive pastry chef at Le Meurice, in Paris, part of the Dorchester Collection.

Grolet's pastries focus on fruits and the reinterpretation of traditional French desserts. He is known for creating desserts that have a likeness to the fruits from which they're made. In order to achieve this effect, Grolet molds a thin shell of white chocolate and airbrushes it to replicate the appearance and texture of fruits such as lemons, apples, and figs.

Grolet is also the author of Fruits, a cookbook that explores his fruit-based desserts.

In March 2018, he opened his first pastry shop within Le Meurice in Paris. Grolet opened a second shop: Cedric Grolet Opéra  in Paris (2019) and a third shop in London: Cedric Grolet at The Berkeley (2022).

Background
At age 21, Cédric moved to Paris to work at Fauchon, a French gourmet food producer. In 2011, after working at Fauchon for six years and training under Christophe Adam, he joined the team at the luxury hotel Le Meurice. In 2013, he was named the executive pastry chef at Le Meurice.

Awards 
 2015, Best Pastry Chef of the Year, Le Chef Magazine
 2016, Relais Desserts Award for Best Pastry Chef
 2017, Omnivore Pastry Award
 2017, World Best Pastry Chef, "Les Grandes Tables du Monde"
 2018, Best Pastry Chef, Gault&Millau
 2018, Best Pastry Chef, The World's 50 Best Restaurants

Bibliography

References

1985 births
Living people
People from Firminy
Pastry chefs
French chefs